The Montenegrins of Croatia are a national minority in the republic. According to the 2011 census, there are 4,517 ethnic Montenegrins in Croatia. The highest number of Montenegrins in Croatia is in the Croatian capital Zagreb.

Montenegrins are officially recognized as an autochthonous national minority, and as such, they elect a special representative to the Croatian Parliament, shared with members of four other national minorities.

History

In 1657, the Doge of Venice Bertuccio Valiero, resettled Peroj with five families (Brcela, Draković, Brajić, Vučeta, and Ljubotina) from the Cernizza region in Montenegro. Following the Cretan War of 1645–1669, twenty other families originally from Montenegro migrated to Peroj. Today Peroj is the centre of the Montenegrins in Istria County.

Demographics

Montenegrins in census for 2001 and 2011:

See also
Croatia–Montenegro relations
Demographics of Croatia
Croats of Montenegro

References

Sources
2001 census of Croatia

External links
National Union of Montenegrins in Rijeka
Council of the Montenegrin National Minority in the City of Zagreb

 
Croatia
Ethnic groups in Croatia